Ilka Van de Vyver (born 26 January 1993) is a Belgian volleyball player. She is a member of the Belgium women's national volleyball team and plays for Rote Raben Vilsbiburg since 2017.

She was part of the Belgian national team at the 2014 FIVB Volleyball Women's World Championship in Italy, and the 2017 FIVB Volleyball World Grand Prix.

Clubs
  Asterix Kieldrecht (2009–2012)
  RC Cannes (2012–2015)
  Azzurra S. Casciano (2015–2016)
  Calcit Volleyball (2016–2017)
  Rote Raben Vilsbiburg (2017–present)

References

External links
http://www.scoresway.com/?sport=volleyball&page=player&id=6553
http://italy2014.fivb.org/en/competition/teams/bel-belgium/players/ilka-van-de-vijver?id=41763
http://www.zimbio.com/photos/Ilka+Van+de+Vyver/Volleyball+Day+3+Baku+2015+1st+European+Games/LVH-WJodi8_
http://www.cev.lu/Competition-Area/PlayerDetails.aspx?TeamID=9729&PlayerID=2310&ID=837

1993 births
Living people
Belgian women's volleyball players
Place of birth missing (living people)
Volleyball players at the 2010 Summer Youth Olympics
Volleyball players at the 2015 European Games
European Games competitors for Belgium
Setters (volleyball)
Youth Olympic gold medalists for Belgium
Expatriate volleyball players in Slovenia
Belgian expatriate sportspeople in Slovenia
21st-century Belgian women